Unix security refers to the means of securing a Unix or Unix-like operating system. A secure environment is achieved not only by the design concepts of these operating systems, but also through vigilant user and administrative practices.

Design concepts

Permissions
A core security feature in these systems is the file system permissions. All files in a typical Unix filesystem have permissions set enabling different access to a file.

Permissions on a file are commonly set using the chmod command and seen through the ls command. For example:
 -r-xr-xr-x  1 root  wheel  745720 Sep  8  2002 /bin/sh

Unix permissions permit different users access to a file. Different user groups have different permissions on a file.

More advanced Unix filesystems include the Access Control List concept which allows permissions to be granted to multiple users or groups.  An Access Control List may be used to grant permission to additional individual users or groups.  For example:
 /pvr [u::rwx,g::r-x,o::r-x/u::rwx,u:sue:rwx,g::r-x,m::rwx,o::r-x]

In this example, which is from the  command on the Linux operating system, the user sue is granted write permission to the /pvr directory.

User groups
Users under Unix style operating systems often belong to managed groups with specific access permissions. This enables users to be grouped by the level of access they have to this system.  Many Unix implementations add an additional layer of security by requiring that a user be a member of the wheel user privileges group in order to access the su command.

Root access

Most Unix and Unix-like systems have an account or group which enables a user to exact complete control over the system, often known as a root account. If access to this account is gained by an unwanted user, this results in a complete breach of the system. A root account however is necessary for administrative purposes, and for the above security reasons the root account is seldom used for day to day purposes (the sudo program is more commonly used), so usage of the root account can be more closely monitored.

Root access "as it should be" can be visualised by those familiar with the Superman stories using the following analogy:

Using a root account is rather like being Superman; an administrator's regular user is more like Clark Kent. Clark Kent becomes Superman for only as long as necessary, in order to save people. He then reverts to his "disguise". Root access should be used in the same fashion. The Clark Kent disguise doesn't really restrict him though, as he is still able to use his super powers. This is analogous to using the sudo program.

User and administrative techniques
Unix has many tools that can improve security if used properly by users and administrators.

Passwords
Selecting a strong password and guarding it properly are probably the most important things a user can do to improve Unix security.
In Unix systems, the essential information about users is stored under the file /etc/passwdThis file keeps track of the users registered in the system and their main definitions. Passwords, or more correctly, the hash of the password, can also be stored in the same place.  The entries in /etc/passwd occupy exactly one line each, and have the following form:

 nickname:password_hash:UserID:GroupID:Complete_Name:home_dir:shell_bin
An example would be:
 xfze:$$1zuW2nX3sslp3qJm9MYDdglEApAc36r/:1000:100:Daniel Ernesto Ortiz Costa:/home/xfze:/bin/bash
Since all users must have read access to the /etc/passwd file to do many common tasks (ls -l /home will use /etc/passwd to map UIDs to login names for example), anyone could also read the password hashes of other users. To solve this problem, the file /etc/shadow was created to store the password hashes, with only root having read access.  Under password shadowing, the 2nd field (password hash) is replaced by an 'x' which tells the system to retrieve the corresponding user's password via the /etc/shadow file.

The /etc/shadow file often only contains values for the first two fields:

 xfze:$$1zuW2nX3sslp3qJm9MYDdglEApAc36r/:::::

The remaining fields in the /etc/shadow file include:
The minimum number of days between password changes
The maximum number of days until the password must be changed
The number of days of warning given before the password must be changed
The number of days after the password must be changed when the account becomes unusable
The date (expressed as the number of days since January 1st, 1970) when the account is expired

These fields may be used to improve Unix security by enforcing a password security policy.

Users and accounts
Administrators should delete old accounts promptly.
su, sudo, ssh only, no remote root logins

Software maintenance

Patching
Operating systems, like all software, may contain bugs in need of fixing or may be enhanced with the addition of new features.  Patching the operating system in a secure manner requires that the software come from a trustworthy source and not have been altered since it was packaged.  Common methods for verifying that operating system patches have not been altered include the use of the digital signature of a cryptographic hash, such as a SHA-256 based checksum, or the use of read-only media.

From a security standpoint, the specific packaging method, such as the dpkg package manager or the RPM Package Manager format originally from Debian and Red Hat Linux, respectively is not as important as the use of features which ensure the integrity of the patch itself.

Source distributions
Source distributions include the ability to examine the code for suspicious content.  The drawback, absent an accompanying cryptographic hash value, is that the user must be able to perform a security analysis of the code themselves.

RPM packages
Linux distributions which use the RPM Package Manager format for providing base functionality and software updates make use of cryptographic hashes and GPG to ensure content integrity.  The hash values are packaged with the RPM file and verified when the package is installed.

Debian packages
Linux distributions which use the Debian .deb package format for providing base functionality and software updates make use of GPG signatures to ensure content integrity.  A signature is computed when the package is constructed and verified later when the package is installed.

Other vendors and distributions
Regardless of the vendor or distribution, all software distributions should provide a mechanism for verifying that the software is legitimate and has not been modified since it was originally packaged.

Services
Unnecessary system software should not be installed or configured on a system.  Software which is no longer required should be removed completely, if possible.

Identify what services are running
 
 
 
  (FreeBSD)

The commands inetd and xinetd act as super-servers for a variety of network protocols such as rlogin, telnet and ftp.

Turning off unnecessary services

using update-rc.d on Debian
using chkconfig on Red Hat Linux
using /etc/rc.conf and /usr/local/etc/rc.d on FreeBSD (mention /etc/rc.local)
using rc-update on Gentoo Linux

This approach is usually called proactive security.  There are some operating systems which are secure by default.  Amongst others, the free BSD flavours (FreeBSD, NetBSD, and OpenBSD) are proactively secure.  For example, the output of netstat on a NetBSD 3.0 workstation clearly outlines this technique:

 $ netstat -a
 Active Internet connections (including servers)
 Proto Recv-Q Send-Q  Local Address          Foreign Address        State
 tcp        0      0  localhost.smtp         *.*                    LISTEN
 tcp        0      0  *.ssh                  *.*                    LISTEN
 Active Internet6 connections (including servers)
 Proto Recv-Q Send-Q  Local Address          Foreign Address        (state)
 tcp6       0      0  localhost.smtp         *.*                    LISTEN
 tcp6       0      0  *.ssh                  *.*                    LISTEN
 Active UNIX domain sockets
 Address  Type   Recv-Q Send-Q    Inode     Conn     Refs  Nextref Addr
 c0d10d80 dgram       0      0        0 c0cd8680        0 c0cb7000 -> /var/run/log
 c0cb7000 dgram       0      0        0 c0cd8680        0        0 -> /var/run/log
 c0cd8680 dgram       0      0 cb9639e8        0 c0d10d80        0 /var/run/log

The following example from a BSD system

 $ sockstat -4
 USER     COMMAND    PID   FD PROTO  LOCAL ADDRESS         FOREIGN ADDRESS
 root     sendmail   569    4 tcp    localhost.smtp        *.*
 root     sshd       593    4 tcp    *.ssh                 *.*

shows that on this machine only the SSH service is listening to all public network interfaces of the computer. sendmail is listening to the loopback interface only.  Access to a service may be further restricted by using a firewall.

File systems

File system security

File system security within UNIX and Unix-like systems is based on 9 permission bits, set user and group ID bits, and the sticky bit, for a total of 12 bits.  These permissions apply almost equally to all filesystem objects such as files, directories and devices.

The 9 permission bits are divided into three groups of three bits each.  The first group describes the permissions of the file owner, the second group describes the permissions of the GID assigned to the file, which by default is the group associated with the file owner or the directory containing the file when it is set-GID, and the third group describes the permissions associated with any process which does not have the same user ID as the file.  Each group of three bits contains a bit indicating the read, write or execute access is granted.  In the case of directories, execute access is interpreted as the permission to perform a filename lookup within the directory.

The set user ID and set group ID bits, commonly abbreviated set-UID and set-GID respectively, are used to change the identity of the process which executes a file having either or both of those bits set.  A file having the set-UID permission bit set will cause a process which executes that file to temporarily switch the effective user ID to that of the file owner.  A file having the set-GID permission bit set will cause a process which executes that file to temporarily switch the effective group ID to that of the file group.  A process may then alternate between the effective user or group ID which it inherited from the file and the real user or group ID which it inherited when the user logged on to the system.  This provides a mechanism by which a process may limit the access rights it possesses to those code regions which require those access rights.  This is a form of a security technique known as privilege separation and improves program security by limiting the unintended or undesirable actions of a processes.

A directory having the set-GID permission bit set will cause a newly created file to have an initial file group value equal to the file group of the directory. This provides a mechanism whereby a subsystem, such as the system's mail subsystem, can create files which have a common file group value so that set-GID processes within that subsystem are then able to read or write the file.

The sticky bit, formally known as the save text on swap bit, derives its name from its original purpose.  Originally the sticky bit caused a process's initial memory image to be stored as a contiguous image on the disk drive which was used to store real memory pages when they were not in use.  This improved the performance of commonly executed commands by making the initial memory image readily available.  Modern UNIX systems no longer perform that function when the bit is set, but the name has been preserved nonetheless.  In the case of files, the sticky-bit may be used by the system to indicate the style of file locking to be performed.  In the case of directories, the sticky bit prevents any process, other than one which has super-user privileges or one having an effective user ID of the file owner, from deleting a file within that directory.  The sticky bit is most commonly used on publicly writable directories, such as the various temporary working space directories on the system.

Root squash
Root squash is a special mapping of the remote superuser (root) identity when using identity authentication (local user is the same as remote user). Under root squash, a client's uid 0 (root) is mapped to 65534 (nobody). It is primarily a feature of NFS but may be available on other systems as well.

Root squash is a technique to avoid privilege escalation on the client machine via suid executables Setuid. Without root squash, an attacker can generate suid binaries on the server that are executed as root on other client, even if the client user does not have superuser privileges. Hence it protects client machines against other malicious clients. It does not protect clients against a malicious server (where root can generate suid binaries), nor does it protect the files of any user other than root (as malicious clients can impersonate any user).

SELinux
SELinux is the set of kernel extensions to control access more precisely, strictly defining both if and how files, folders, network ports and other resources can be accessed by the confined process. This system is mostly used to restrict processes (database, server) rather than human users. It can also limit processes that run as root. Other distributions use comparable alternatives like AppArmor.

Viruses and virus scanners
Unix-like operating systems are immune to most Microsoft Windows viruses because binaries created to run on Windows generally won't run on other platforms.  However, many Unix like installations provide file storage services to Microsoft Windows clients, such as through the use of Samba software, and may unintentionally become a repository for viruses stored by users. It is common for Unix servers to act as mail transfer agents and as a consequence email virus scanning is often installed. The ClamAV virus scanner is available in source code form and may be used to scan Unix file systems for viruses which infect other operating systems.

There are viruses and worms that target Unix-like operating systems.  In fact, the first computer worm—the Morris worm—targeted Unix systems.

Firewalls
Network firewall protects systems and networks from network threats which exist on the opposite side of the firewall. Firewalls can block access to strictly internal services, unwanted users and in some cases filter network traffic by content.

iptables
iptables is the current user interface for interacting with Linux kernel netfilter functionality.  It replaced ipchains.  Other Unix like operating systems may provide their own native functionality and other open source firewall products exist.  More detailed information about iptables is contained elsewhere.  A brief discussion is contained here in order to describe how iptables may be used to configure a Linux firewall.

netfilter provides a state-full packet filter which can be configured according to network interface, protocol, source and/or destination address, source and/or destination port and the state of the packet. A network packet traverses several chains between the time it is received by a network interface and the time it is accepted by the host or forwarded to another host. The  chain is traversed for all packets as they are received by a network interface, regardless of whether they are to be accepted by the host or forwarded to another host. The  chain is traversed for all packets as they are transmitted by a network interface. The  chain is traversed for those packets are being routed through the host from one network interface to another, such as is the case for a multi-homed system (a system with more than one physical network interface).

Each of the built-in chains has a default policy which defines what action is taken for a packet which reaches the end of the chain.

The simplest iptables firewall consists of rules for each desired service, followed by a rule which indicates that any packets which reach this rule are dropped.  A system which only permitted, for example, incoming email traffic would have a rule which accepted connections on the SMTP port, and then dropped others.  A rule would be required which indicated that all established connections were also permitted so that outgoing connections would receive responses from other systems.

INPUT chain
The following example shows a simple packet filter for the  chain for the above described example:

 Chain INPUT (policy DROP 0 packets, 0 bytes)
  pkts bytes target     prot opt   in        out                 source               destination
     0     0 ACCEPT     all—any    any     anywhere             anywhere            state ESTABLISHED
     0     0 ACCEPT     tcp—any    any     anywhere             anywhere            tcp dpt:smtp
     0     0 LOG        all—any    any     anywhere             anywhere            LOG level warning
     0     0 DROP       all—any    any     anywhere             anywhere

OUTPUT chain
In some instances it may be desirable for a firewall to limit certain outgoing connections to a certain set of approved systems. This is known as egress filtering and may be used to prevent viruses within the firewall from escaping to other systems. For example, it may be the policy of a network to limit outgoing email connections to a single authorized email servers as a way of combating e-mail spam. This could be achieved by the following example:

 Chain OUTPUT (policy ACCEPT)
  pkts bytes target     prot opt    in     out                  source              destination
     0     0 DROP       tcp—any    any    !server               anywhere            tcp dpt:smtp

This rule assumes that the host which is acting as the firewall will not be sending email itself, such as to the email server. This is a good assumption as typically a firewall system contains the minimal amount of system code needed to act as a firewall.

A more restrictive  chain would contain permissive entries for those services which may be accessed outside the firewall and then a restrictive policy for the chain itself.

General
Secure network communication:
Layer 7: 
Layers 4,5: 
Layer 3: 
Layer 2: PPTP

Packet sniffing:
tcpdump, Wireshark

Attacks:
Man in the middle attack
LAND, ping of death, Christmas tree packet, Denial of service et al.
Software tools based password/passphrase/key stealing attacks on the system. Such as strace/truss/tusc/dtrace/SystemTap based ones.

Advanced
rootkits, kernel modules, chkrootkit
exploit details, buffer overflows, local vs remote

Service details
banners
SMTP - spam
Sendmail - banners help header version etc.
Domain Name System - reverse mapping dnssec

References

General
 Practical UNIX and Internet Security, Simson Garfinkel and Gene Spafford, O'Reilly & Associates, 2003.

External links

 The Unix Security Model for web server administration  Robert K. Moniot 2000
 An Architectural Overview of UNIX Network Security  Robert B. Reinhardt 1993
 Unix security papers

Operating system security
System administration
Unix
Linux administration
Linux security software